Asajaya may refer to:
Asajaya
Asajaya (state constituency), represented in the Sarawak State Legislative Assembly